Montseny may refer to:

 Montseny, a village and municipality in Catalonia
 Montseny Massif, a mountain range in Catalonia
 Federica Montseny (1905—1994), Spanish politician and anarchist
 Juan Montseny Carret (1864—1942), Catalan anarchist